Foothill High School may refer to:

Foothill High School (Bakersfield, California)
Foothill High School (Henderson, Nevada)
Foothill High School (Orange County, California)
Foothill High School (Palo Cedro, California)
Foothill High School (Pleasanton, California)
Foothill High School (Sacramento, California)
Foothill High School (Ventura, California)

See also
Foothill Technology High School, Ventura, California
Foothills Christian High School, El Cajon, San Diego County, California